Owey Island is an island off the coast of west County Donegal, Ireland.

Geography
The island is around 300 acres (1.2 square kilometres) in area. It lies off the Donegal coast near Kincasslagh. The island's highest hill, Moylemore, is at 102 m.
The buildings of the island are located on its southern part, being the northern one rocky and exposed to winds. 
On Owey there is no mains electricity or public water supply.

Demographics

The table reports data taken from Discover the Islands of Ireland (Alex Ritsema, Collins Press, 1999) and the Census of Ireland.
Owey Island was full-time inhabited up to the mid 1970s. Later on it only had part-time residents, mainly at summer. Most of them own old cottages inherited by ancestors who used to permanently live in the island.

History

Plenty of fish in the waters surrounding the island and the land that, fertilized with seaweed, was suitable for growing vegetables, allowed a simple lifestyle to more than 100 people. Turf was used to heat the homes; some of the islanders used it also to heat the equipment to produce single malt and liquors.

In the olden days Owey had a post office and a school, which closed in 1971; its remains are still there. It had just one teacher in charge of the primary education of all ages, while for their secondary education children had to be sent to the mainland.

See also
 List of islands of Ireland

References

External links

The island page on welovedonegal.com

Islands of County Donegal
Uninhabited islands of Ireland